Leipzig Markt is a central railway station in the city of Leipzig, Germany. It was built as part of the Leipzig City Tunnel project and opened on 15 December 2013, enabling passengers to travel directly by rail from Leipzig Hauptbahnhof to the city centre.

Train services
Leipzig Markt station is served by seven of the ten S-Bahn Mitteldeutschland lines. Planners hope that the high frequency service and fast journey times will increase passenger capacity on the city's public transport and thus relieve road traffic in the city.

Design
Located 22 m underground, Leipzig Markt station has a 140 m long island platform. There are two entrances, in the north and south of the market square. The south entrance is the renovated Art Deco original entrance to a former underground exhibition hall dating from 1925. The side walls have a facade of terracotta slabs, while front and rear station walls and the service rooms on the platform have ceramic decoration.

References

External links

 City Tunnel website

Markt
Leipzig Markt